Horizon Monaco was the ruling coalition of Monaco after the 2013 Monegasque general election, winning 20 of the 24 available seats in the National Council. The coalition, led by Laurent Nouvion, was composed mostly of the conservative Rally & Issues political party along with Synergie Monegasque and Union for the Principality. However, in 2016, many members defected to a new coalition, "New Majority", which became the new ruling coalition. In the elections on February 11, 2018, it was transformed into an electoral list, which won two seats. Before 2023, it was represented in the National Council by Béatrice Fresko-Rolfo and Jacques Rit.

Electoral history

National Council elections

External links
Official Website (Archived)
Horizon Monaco on Twitter

References

Defunct political parties in Monaco
Monegasque nationalism
Monarchist parties in Monaco
Social conservative parties
Political parties established in 2012
Political parties disestablished in 2020